ZCTU may mean:

 Zambia Congress of Trade Unions
 Zimbabwe Congress of Trade Unions